Morro Brás is a settlement in the eastern part of the island of São Nicolau, Cape Verde. It is situated on the north coast, 11 km east of Ribeira Brava.

See also
List of villages and settlements in Cape Verde

References

Villages and settlements in São Nicolau, Cape Verde
Ribeira Brava, Cape Verde